Laya or Layah may refer to:

People
 Laya (surname), a Chinese Indonesian surname
 Laya Francis (born 1963), former Test and One Day International cricketer who represented India
 Laya Raki (born 1927), former dancer and film actress popular in Germany in the 1950s and early 1960s
 Layah (singer) (born 1989), Ukrainian singer
 The Layap people of the Himalayas
 Jean-Louis Laya (1761–1833), dramatist

Places
 Laya, Bhutan, a town in Gasa District in northwestern Bhutan
 Laya, Guinea, a village in the Forécariah Prefecture in the Kindia Region of Guinea
 Layah, Iran, a village in Gilan Province, Iran
 Layyah, a city in Punjab province, Pakistan

Other uses
 Laya, a term for tempo in Indian classical music
 Heteropoda venatoria, a spider of family Sparassidaeknown, known as laya in some places
 Laia (tool), a farming implement known in Spanish as laya
 Laya Healthcare, a health insurance company in Ireland
 Laya, the Witch of Red Pooh, a manhwa series by Yo Yo
 Laya yoga, a form of Yoga

See also 
 Layyah (disambiguation)
 Layar (disambiguation)